Russell Harold Peterson (August 25, 1905 – October 1971) was an American football tackle who played in the National Football League (NFL) for the Boston Braves.  He played college football at the University of Montana.

Peterson was born on August 25, 1905 in Midale, Saskatchewan. He attended Custer County High School in Miles City, Montana. Peterson attended college at the University of Montana where he played college football. He played as a lineman in the National Football League for the Boston Braves in 1932. He played in three games in the NFL.

References

External links
 

1905 births
1971 deaths
American football tackles
Canadian players of American football
Boston Braves (NFL) players
Montana Grizzlies football players
People from Miles City, Montana
Players of American football from Montana
Gridiron football people from Saskatchewan